The 16th New Brunswick Legislative Assembly represented New Brunswick between October 19, 1854, and May 30, 1856.

The assembly sat at the pleasure of the Governor of New Brunswick John Henry Thomas Manners-Sutton.

Daniel Hanington was chosen as speaker for the house.

List of members

Notes:

References
Journal of the House of Assembly of ... New Brunswick from ... October to ... November, 1854 ... (1854)

Terms of the New Brunswick Legislature
1854 in Canada
1855 in Canada
1856 in Canada
1854 establishments in New Brunswick
1856 disestablishments in New Brunswick